Port Famine may refer to:

 Port Famine, Sonora, a 19th-century steamboat landing and woodyard on the lower Colorado River in Sonora, Mexico
 Puerto del Hambre ("Port Famine"),  also known as  Ciudad del Rey Don Felipe, a historic settlement site in Chile on the Strait of Magellan